Sri Lankans who are notable for their business and industrial success in Sri Lanka.

 Upali Wijewardene (Automobile / Media) 
 Lalith Kotelawala   (Banking and Finance) 
 Otara Gunewardene  (Fashion)  
 H. K. Dharmadasa  (Healthcare /  Construction) 
 Soma Edirisinghe   (Media / Film / Jewelry / Finance) 
 Victor Hettigoda   (Ayurveda Medicine) 
 Richard Pieris  ( Retail / Manufacturing )
Dhammika Perera  (Businessman/ Investor / Philanthropist)
Ishara Nanayakkara (Entrepreneur / Banking)
Mahesh Amalean (Textile)
Ashok Pathirage (Entrepreneur / Banking / Retail)
Ravidu Mario Weerakoon (Entrepreneur / E-commerce)
Shehan Sachintha  (Entrepreneur)

References

Lists of Sri Lankan people
Industry in Sri Lanka
Sri Lankans